Chris Lyttle (born 19 January 1981) is an Alliance Party of Northern Ireland politician who was a Member of the Legislative Assembly (MLA) for Belfast East from 2010 to 2022. He succeeded Naomi Long as Alliance Party MLA for Belfast East on 5 July 2010 and was elected to serve the constituency for another term on 7 May 2011, then again in 2016 and 2017. Lyttle retired at the 2022 Assembly Election.

Early life and career
Born and raised in East Belfast, Lyttle attended Belmont and Strandtown Primary Schools, Sullivan, and Queen's University Belfast, where he received a First Class Honours Degree in Government and Politics. Lyttle was awarded a Helen Ramsey Turtle Scholarship for Conflict Management study at the University of California and a Frank Knox Fellowship for postgraduate training in Public Policy & Administration at Harvard University. He is also an alumnus of the Washington Ireland Program.

Lyttle's professional experience includes work as Northern Ireland Assembly Constituency & Research Assistant to Alliance Party Deputy Leader, Naomi Long. He is known for his service to community organisations, business owners and other groups on a wide range of issues such as; housing, education, health, planning, employment and community safety. He has also served as Deputy Chair of the East Belfast District Policing Partnership and is a qualified Irish Football Association UEFA B Licence and Disability Football Coach, and is an active member of his local church.

Political career
Lyttle was Deputy Chair of the Assembly Committee with responsibility for the scrutiny of the policy of the Office of the First Minister and deputy First Minister. These include the Programme for Government, the Investment Strategy, Community Relations, Social Investment, Equality, Community Development, Children & Young People and Older People. Since May 2016, he has been vice-chair of the Assembly Committee on Education.

Lyttle chairs the All Party Group (APG) on Cycling and the APG on Children and Young People, as well as vice chairs the APG on Postal Issues. He is a member of the following APG groups: Fairtrade, International Development, Trade Unions, Small and Medium Enterprises (SMEs), Football, Heart Disease & Stroke, Science and Technology, Human Trafficking, Rugby, UNSCR 1325 Women, Peace and Security, Learning Disability, Cancer, Visual Impairment, Autism, Community and Voluntary Sector, and Ethnic Minority Communities.

On 29 October 2021, Lyttle announced that he would be stepping down at the 2022 Assembly election.

References

External links
Official website

1981 births
Living people
Politicians from Belfast
Harvard University alumni
Alumni of Queen's University Belfast
Alliance Party of Northern Ireland MLAs
Northern Ireland MLAs 2007–2011
Northern Ireland MLAs 2011–2016
Northern Ireland MLAs 2016–2017
Northern Ireland MLAs 2017–2022
Northern Ireland MLAs 2022–2027